The Japanese Peruvian Association is a cultural association and institution that brings together and represents Japanese citizens and those of Japanese descent residing in Peru.

See also
Japan–Peru relations
Teatro Peruano Japonés

References

Japan–Peru relations